Krauchenwies is a municipality in the district of Sigmaringen in Baden-Württemberg in Germany.

Geography
It is on the Oberschwäbischen Barockstraße (west route) and on the southern edge of the conservation area of Obere Donau.

The Ablach, which originates on the continental divide, flows through town and on to the Danube. The landscape is hilly and wooded, sloping down to the Danube valley.

History
Krauchenwies is first mentioned in a document from the Reichenau monastery in 1202. The name appeared as Cruchinwis (meaning "Cruchin meadow"). By 1216, it had its own parish.

Later, the Lords of Leiterberg took over the village and sold it at the end of the 13th century to the Habsburgs. In 1595, Charles II bought Krauchenwies, which has been closely tied to the county of Sigmaringen ever since. Because Hohenzollern-Sigmaringen lands became Prussian, the town belonged to Prussia starting in 1850.

Since 1975, the town has incorporated six surrounding villages.

Mayors
In 1999 Jochen Spieß was elected mayor of Krauchenwies. He was reelected in 2007 and 2015.

 1963–1999: Heinz Schöllhammer (CDU)
 since 1999: Jochen Spieß (CDU)

References

Sigmaringen (district)